Almighty Dollar is a cultural concept

The Almighty Dollar may also refer to:
The Almighty Dollar (1910 film)
The Almighty Dollar (1916 film) 
The Almighty Dollar (1923 film)
The Almighty Dollar, Campbell Summer Soundstage 1954

Almighty Dollar, album by Rod Piazza 2011
"The Almighty Dollar", song by Ozzy Osbourne from Black Rain (Ozzy Osbourne album)
"The Almighty Dollar", song by Devin the Dude from Waitin' to Inhale